Malaba is a village in the South Province of Cameroon. It is located on the Atlantic coast north of Campo.

References

Populated places in South Region (Cameroon)